
Odenbach is a village in the county of Kusel, Rhineland-Palatinate.

Odenbach may also refer to:

Places in Germany

Municipalities
 Schallodenbach, village in the county of Kaiserslautern, Rhineland-Palatinate

Rivers and streams
 Odenbach (Brettach), right hand tributary of the Brettach before the Vorder Mill, Mainhardt, Schwäbisch Hall, Baden-Württemberg
 Odenbach (Buchholzbach), left hand upper reaches of the Buchholzbach between the mills of Ellesheimer and Buchholzbacher Mühle, Bad Münstereifel, Euskirchen, North Rhine-Westphalia (empties into the Armuthsbach)
 Odenbach (Glan), right hand tributary of the Glan near Odenbach, county of Kusel, Rhineland-Palatinate
 Odenbach (Lampertsbach), left hand upper reaches of the Lampertsbach (Ahr) as far as Alendorf, Blankenheim, Euskirchen, North Rhine-Westphalia
 Odenbach (Rur), right hand tributary of the Rur in Blens, Heimbach, Düren, North Rhine-Westphalia 
 Odenbach (Schauerbach), right hand tributary of the Schauerbach before the Weihermühle Mill, Herschberg, Südwestpfalz, Rhineland-Palatinate

Buildings
 Odenbach Castle, ruin of a water castle in Odenbach, Kusel, Rhineland-Palatinate
 Odenbach Synagogue, historic country synagogue in Odenbach, Kusel, Rhineland-Palatinate

People
 Friedrich Odenbach (born 1945), German politician (SPD)
 Marcel Odenbach (born 1953), German video artist
 Paul Erwin Odenbach (1924–2007), German psychiatrist and medical politician

See also
 Ödenbach (disambiguation)
 Oderbach, a river of Hesse, Germany